John Stephen Monagan (December 23, 1911 – October 23, 2005) was a Connecticut politician, lawyer, and author.

Monagan graduated from Dartmouth College in 1933, where he majored in French literature and was the editor of the Dartmouth Jack-O-Lantern. He was a Brother of the Dartmouth Chapter of the Alpha Delta Phi. After attending Harvard University law school, he served on the Board of Aldermen in Waterbury, Connecticut and became Mayor of Waterbury in 1943, serving until 1948.

In 1958, he was elected Congressman from a district including Waterbury and served in the House of Representatives from 1959 until 1973, leaving after being defeated for re-election in 1972. After leaving Congress, Monagan practiced as a lawyer in Washington, D.C. and was active in amateur music and in charitable causes. Monagan wrote several books including his memoirs and a biography of Justice Oliver Wendell Holmes, Jr., titled The Grand Panjandrum: Mellow Years of Justice Holmes (1988).

He also maintained a decades-long correspondence with the British novelist Anthony Powell. He died in October  2005 after a long illness, at the age of 93. He continued to be active into his nineties as a writer and book reviewer; a month before his death, he spoke at a symposium honoring Anthony Powell's centenary at Georgetown University.

The Papers of John S. Monagan at Dartmouth College Library

References 

|-

1911 births
2005 deaths
Connecticut lawyers
Dartmouth College alumni
Harvard Law School alumni
Mayors of Waterbury, Connecticut
Writers from Waterbury, Connecticut
Democratic Party members of the United States House of Representatives from Connecticut
20th-century American politicians
20th-century American lawyers